Francis Broderip (1788 - 17 July 1871) was a solicitor of Lincoln's Inn, art collector, and philanthropist. In 1866 he gave £20,000 of Brazilian bonds to the Middlesex Hospital, London, on condition that the gift was kept secret during his lifetime. He also endowed the Law Society's Broderip Prize of a gold medal to a promising young lawyer. In 1987 the Broderip Ward was opened at the Middlesex Hospital, the first ward dedicated to the care and treatment of people affected by HIV/AIDS in the United Kingdom.

Early life
Francis Broderip was born in Middlesex, England, in 1788 to Francis and Ann Broderip. He was christened at St Andrew's Church, Holborn, in March 1788.

Personal life

Broderip lived at 2 Gower Street in London's Bloomsbury district, in a house that was later occupied by women's suffrage pioneer Millicent Fawcett (1847-1929) and is now a grade II listed building.

Career

Broderip practiced as a solicitor in Lincoln's Inn. He endowed the Law Society's Broderip Prize of a gold medal to a promising young lawyer.

In 1866 he gave a gift of £20,000 4% Brazilian bonds to the Middlesex Hospital on condition that the gift was kept secret during his lifetime. His name was released as the donor immediately after his death.

He had a large art collection that was sold by Christie, Manson & Woods after his death in a sale of more than 1,500 lots that lasted nine days and included works in oil, watercolour, drawings, bronzes, ivories, porcelain, miniatures, and furniture. There were five works by J. M. W. Turner, The Little Scribe by William Etty, landscapes by Thomas Creswick, Boy with a House of Cards by Jean Chardin, and a Scene from Le Diable Boiteux by Augustus Egg. The image of a boy building a house of cards has traditionally been interpreted as a metaphor for the fragility of life and the temptations facing the young.

Death and legacy
He died at his home of 2 Gower Street, London, on 17 July 1871, leaving an estate of under £160,000 which was later resworn as under £180,000. The sale of his pictures in February 1872 raised £20,000 which was donated to the Middlesex Hospital. The same year, the governors of the hospital created two Broderip scholarships in his memory and the Clayton Ward was renamed the Broderip Ward.

In 1987 the Broderip Ward was opened at the Middlesex Hospital, the first ward dedicated to the care and treatment of people affected by HIV/AIDS in the United Kingdom.

References 

1788 births
1871 deaths
English solicitors
English philanthropists
People from Middlesex
Lincoln's Inn
English art collectors
Middlesex Hospital